FV Bad Vilbel is a German football club from Bad Vilbel, near Frankfurt, Hesse. Founded on 30 March 1919 as SV 1919 Bad Vilbel, they merged with FG Phönix Bad Vilbel in 1933 to become FC Phönix Bad Vilbel and were re-established under their current name after World War II. The club today has a membership of about 450 and was playing in the Oberliga Hessen (IV) as a mid-table side from 1992 to 2007. Bad Vilbel's best result there was a third-place finish in 2000. In 2007, the club was relegated to the Verbandsliga Hessen-Süd. They currently play in the fifth-tier of German football, the Hessenliga.

The team plays its home matches in the Nidda-Sportfeld which has a capacity of 6,000.

Honours
The club's honours:

League

 Verbandsliga Hessen-Süd
 Champions: 2017–18
 Landesliga Hessen-Süd
 Champions: 1991–92
 Runners-up: 1987–88, 1988–89
 Bezirksklasse
 Champions: 1929, 1938–39, 1986–87
 A-Klasse
 Champions: 1973–74
 B-Klasse Frankfurt/Ost
 Champions: 1970–71
 B-Klasse Obertaunus/Usingen
 Champions: 1966–67

Cup

 Hesse Cup
 Runners-up: 1994–95

Recent seasons
The recent season-by-season performance of the club:

 With the introduction of the Regionalliga's in 1994 and the 3. Liga in 2008 as the new third tier, below the 2. Bundesliga, all leagues below dropped one tier. Also in 2008, a large number of football leagues in Hesse were renamed, with the Oberliga Hessen becoming the Hessenliga, the Landesliga becoming the Verbandsliga, the Bezirksoberliga becoming the Gruppenliga and the Bezirksliga becoming the Kreisoberliga.

References

External links
 Official team site
 Das deutsche Fußball-Archiv  historical German domestic league tables
 FV Bad Vilbel at Weltfussball.de 

Football clubs in Germany
Football clubs in Hesse
Association football clubs established in 1919
1919 establishments in Germany